The Ruabon–Barmouth line was a standard-gauge line owned by the Great Western Railway across the north of Wales which connected Ruabon, in the east, with Barmouth on the west coast.

Connections
 At Trevor an incline ran to the Monsanto works. This also connected to the Pontcysyllte Branch, which eventually rejoined the main line near Wrexham.
 At Corwen the line connected with the Denbigh, Ruthin and Corwen Railway line.
 At Bala Junction the line connected with the Bala and Festiniog Railway.
 At Barmouth Junction, the line connected with the Cambrian Coast Line, which was owned by the Aberystwith and Welsh Coast Railway.

History
The line opened in stages by various companies:
 Vale of Llangollen Railway – 1 December 1861 (goods); 2 June 1862 (passenger)
 Llangollen and Corwen Railway – 1 May 1865
 Corwen and Bala Railway – 16 July 1866 (Corwen to Llandrillo); 1 April 1868 (Llandrillo to Bala)
 Bala and Dolgelly Railway – 4 August 1868
 Aberystwith and Welsh Coast Railway – 10 October 1867

The Aberystwith and Welsh Coast Railway was absorbed by the Cambrian Railways which, with the other companies, was absorbed into the GWR.

The line was double track from Ruabon (Llangollen Jc) to Llangollen Goods Junction. Beyond, there were passing places at Deeside, Glyndyfrdwy, Carrog, Corwen, Llandrillo, Llandderfel, Bala Junction, Llanuwchllyn, Garneddwen Halt, Drws-y-Nant, Bont Newydd, Dolgellau and Penmaenpool.

Closure 
The whole line was listed for closure as part of the Beeching Axe. Goods services between Morfa Mawddach (formerly Barmouth Jn) and Llangollen ceased in 1964. Although the whole line was planned to close for passenger services on 18 January 1965, services were suspended on 12 December 1964 following flooding. The section between Ruabon and Llangollen was subsequently reopened on 17 December for passenger trains until 18 January after which only freight services ran until 1968 when the line was closed completely. The section between Llangollen and Bala Junction was abandoned following flooding although a substitute bus service served the stations until 18 January 1965. The section between Bala, Bala Junction and Dolgellau was reopened on 17 December and the section Dolgellau to Morfa Mawddach reopened on 14 December, followed by closure on 18 January 1965.

Lifting of the track was completed in 1969.

Preservation
Two sections of the line have been reopened as preserved railways; the narrow gauge Bala Lake Railway in 1972; and the standard gauge Llangollen Railway which first opened to passengers in 1981.

A  section between Barmouth Junction and Dolgellau is used as the Mawddach Trail, a cycle route and bridleway, conversion of which was assisted in 1976 when heavy floods washed away most of the remaining ballast.

The trackbed has also been redeveloped at the west end of Corwen and a number of houses and apartments have been built immediately east of Llangollen. Infringements occur between Llangollen and Acrefair (typically garden extensions and outbuildings) and the cutting through Cefn Mawr is partially blocked following land slips. At the end of Llanuwchllyn station, a house straddles the trackbed. In the countryside between these sites the trackbed remains disused although some sections are used for grazing cattle.

In 2020, a group was formed with the aim of reopening the section from Bala to Llandrillo as a greenway.

References

Notes

Sources 
 
 
 The Llangollen Line – Ruabon to Barmouth, by W G Rear & N Jones. 
 Railway Walks: Exploring Disused Railways, by Gareth Lovett Jones. 
 RAILSCOT on Vale of Llangollen Railway
 RAILSCOT on Llangollen and Corwen Railway
 RAILSCOT on Corwen and Bala Railway
 RAILSCOT on Bala and Dolgelly Railway
 RAILSCOT on Aberystwith and Welsh Coast Railway 
 Llangollen Railway site, including a detailed history of the whole line
 Gwynedd Council – Recreational Routes – Mawddach Trail

Closed railway lines in Wales
Railway lines opened in 1868
Standard gauge railways in Wales
1868 establishments in Wales
1965 disestablishments in Wales